Dorabjee is an Indian given name and surname. Notable people with the name include:

Dorabjee Naorojee Mithaiwala, Indian businessman
Vahbbiz Dorabjee (born 1985), Indian model and television actress

Indian given names
Indian surnames